Lyudmila Korobova (born 15 May 1942) is a Russian former swimmer. She competed in two events at the 1960 Summer Olympics for the Soviet Union.

References

1942 births
Living people
Russian female swimmers
Russian female breaststroke swimmers
Olympic swimmers of the Soviet Union
Swimmers at the 1960 Summer Olympics
Sportspeople from Chelyabinsk
Soviet female swimmers